Horace McMahon (May 17, 1906 – August 17, 1971) was an American actor. He was one of Hollywood's favorite heavies.

McMahon began his acting career on Broadway, then appeared in many films and television series. In 1962, he received a Primetime Emmy Award nomination for his performance in the series Naked City (1958–1963).

Early years
McMahon was born in South Norwalk, Connecticut. He became interested in acting when he was a student at Fordham University School of Law.

Career
In his early career he mostly played thugs or jailbirds, but in 1949 he starred in his most acclaimed role, as Lieutenant Monaghan in the drama play Detective Story and in 1951 he reprised his character in Paramount Pictures' film version Detective Story, alongside Kirk Douglas and Eleanor Parker.

McMahon also starred on television, in the ABC police series Naked City as Lt. Mike Parker, a gruff, no-nonsense, but warmhearted cop's cop, interested only in justice and doing the job according to the proper rules of the game. He was nominated for an Emmy Award for this role.

In 1964, McMahon played Hank McClure, a police contact in the CBS drama series, Mr. Broadway.

In 1968 he played police Captain Tom Farrell in The Detective starring Frank Sinatra.

He also did voice-overs for commercials, including those for Close-Up toothpaste and Armstrong tires.

Legacy
In 1972, a 375-seat theater named in honor of McMahon was created in the McCrory Building on Washington Street in South Norwalk, Connecticut.

Personal life
McMahon was married to actress Louise Campbell from 1938 until his death in 1971. Their daughter, Martha McMahon, also became an actress.

Selected filmography

 Bulldog Edition (1936) – Horace Boyd (uncredited)
 Navy Blues (1937) – Gateleg
 They Gave Him a Gun (1937) – Prison Inmate (uncredited)
 Kid Galahad (1937) – Reporter at Press Conference (uncredited)
 Public Wedding (1937) – Reporter
 Exclusive (1937) – Beak McArdle
 Bad Guy (1937) – Malone the Informer (uncredited)
 The Wrong Road (1937) – Blackie Clayton
 A Girl with Ideas (1937) – Al
 The Last Gangster (1937) – Limpy (uncredited)
 Paid to Dance (1937) – LaRue
 When G-Men Step In (1938) – Jennings
 King of the Newsboys (1938) – Lockjaw
 Ladies in Distress (1938) – 2nd Thug
 Fast Company (1938) – Danny Scolado
 Marie Antoinette (1938) – Rabblerouser (uncredited)
 The Crowd Roars (1938) – Rocky Simpson (uncredited)
 Tenth Avenue Kid (1938) – Max Hooker
 I Am the Law (1938) – Prisoner (uncredited)
 Wanted by the Police (1938) – Russo's Chief Henchman
 Broadway Musketeers (1938) – Gurk, Vince's Henchman
 Secrets of a Nurse (1938) – Larry Carson
 Newsboys' Home (1938) – Bartsch
 Federal Man-Hunt (1938) – Snuffy Deegan
 Pride of the Navy (1939) – Gloomey Kelly
 Pirates of the Skies (1939) – Henchman Artie (uncredited)
 I Was a Convict (1939) – Missouri Smith
 Sergeant Madden (1939) – Philadelphia
 For Love or Money (1939) – Dead Eyes
 Calling Dr. Kildare (1939) – J. Harold 'Fog Horn' Murphy – Taxi Driver (uncredited)
 Big Town Czar (1939) – Punchy
 Rose of Washington Square (1939) – Irving
 The Gracie Allen Murder Case (1939) – Gus (uncredited)
 6,000 Enemies (1939) – Prisoner Boxcar (uncredited)
 Bachelor Mother (1939) – Dance Floor Official (uncredited)
 She Married a Cop (1939) – Joe Nash
 Quick Millions (1939) – Floyd 'Bat' Douglas
 Sabotage (1939) – Art Kruger
 Another Thin Man (1939) – MacFay's Chauffeur (uncredited)
 That's Right—You're Wrong (1939) – Hood (uncredited)
 Laugh It Off (1939) – Phil Ferrranti
 Oh Johnny, How You Can Love (1940) – 'Lefty' Hodges – Bank Robber
 The Marines Fly High (1940) – Sgt. Monk O'Hara
 The Ghost Comes Home (1940) – Dave – the Nightclub Manager (uncredited)
 Dr. Kildare's Strange Case (1940) – J. Harold 'Fog Horn' Murphy
 My Favorite Wife (1940) – Truck Driver Giving Lift to Ellen (uncredited)
 Gangs of Chicago (1940) – Cry-Baby
 I Can't Give You Anything But Love, Baby (1940) – Bugs
 Millionaires in Prison (1940) – Sylvester Odgen 'SOS' Schofield
 We Who Are Young (1940) – Foreman
 The Golden Fleecing (1940) – Process Server (uncredited)
 Dr. Kildare Goes Home (1940) – J. Harold 'Fog Horn' Murphy (uncredited)
 The Leather Pushers (1940) – Slugger Mears
 The Bride Wore Crutches (1940) – Brains
 Margie (1940) – Detective
 Melody Ranch (1940) – Bud Wildhack
 Dr. Kildare's Crisis (1940) – J. Harold 'Fog Horn' Murphy
 Come Live with Me (1941) – Taxi Driver
 Rookies on Parade (1941) – Tiger Brannigan
 Lady Scarface (1941) – Mullen
 Dr. Kildare's Wedding Day (1941) – J. Harold 'Fog Horn' Murphy (uncredited)
 Buy Me That Town (1941) – Fingers Flint
 The Stork Pays Off (1941) – 'Ears-to-the-Ground' Hinkle
 Birth of the Blues (1941) – Wolf
 Jail House Blues (1942) – Swifty
 Stage Door Canteen (1943) – Himself
 Good Luck, Mr. Yates (1943) – Truck Driver (uncredited)
 Dangerous Blondes (1943) – Hoodlum (uncredited)
 Timber Queen (1944) – Rodney
 The Navy Way (1944) – Sailor Saxon (uncredited)
 Roger Touhy, Gangster (1944) – Maxie Sharkey (uncredited)
 13 Rue Madeleine (1946) – Burglary Instructor (scenes deleted)
 Joe Palooka in Fighting Mad (1948) – Looie
 Smart Woman (1948) – Lefty (uncredited)
 Waterfront at Midnight (1948) – Hank Bremmer
 The Return of October (1948) – Big Louie (uncredited)
 Detective Story (1951) – Lt. Monaghan
 Abbott and Costello Go to Mars (1953) – Mugsy
 Man in the Dark (1953) – Arnie
 Fast Company (1953) – 'Two Pair' Buford
 Champ for a Day (1953) – Sam Benton
 Duffy of San Quentin (1954) – Pierson
 Susan Slept Here (1954) – Sergeant Monty Maizel
 Blackboard Jungle (1955) – Detective
 My Sister Eileen (1955) – Police Officer Lonigan
 Texas Lady (1955) – Stringer Winfield
 The Delicate Delinquent (1957) – Police Captain Riley
 Beau James (1957) – Prosecutor
 Never Steal Anything Small (1959) – O. K. Merritt
 The Swinger (1966) – Detective Sergeant Hooker
 The Detective (1968) – Farrell

References

External links

1906 births
1971 deaths
Male actors from Connecticut
American male film actors
American male stage actors
American male television actors
Actors from Norwalk, Connecticut
Fordham University School of Law alumni
20th-century American male actors